Neritona granosa is a species of freshwater snail with an operculum, an aquatic gastropod mollusk in the family Neritidae, the nerites.

Distribution
This species of nerite is endemic in Hawaii: Maui.

Ecology 
Neritina granosa lives in streams. This species has marine larvae that migrate into and up streams after a period of oceanic dispersal. Most likely, the planktonic larvae of this neritid snail disperse across the oceanic expanses that separate the main Hawaiian Islands, and thus it can colonize streams on any or all of these islands.

References
This article incorporates public domain text (a public domain work of the United States Government) from reference.

Further reading 
 Ford J. I. (1979). "Biology of a Hawaiian fluvial gastropod Neritina granosa Sowerby (Prosobranchia: Neritidae)". M.S. Thesis, University of Hawaii, Honolulu, Hawaii: 94 pp.
 Hau S., Way C. M. & Burky A. J. (1992). "Life cycle of the endemic limpet Neritina granosa (Sowerby)", in Palauhulu Stream, Maui. 43rd Annual Meeting of American Institute of Biological Sciences. Ecological Society of America, 9–13 August, Honolulu, Hawaii (abstract).
 Hodges M. H.-D. (July 1992). "Population biology and genetics of the endemic Hawaiian stream gastropod Neritina granosa (Prosobranchia: Neritidae): implications for conservation". Honors Thesis, Wildlife Biology Program University of Montana, Missoula, Montana.
 Haynes, A. 2005. An evaluation of members of the genera Clithon Montfort, 1810 and Neritina Lamarck 1816 (Gastropoda: Neritidae). Molluscan Research 25(2): 75-84.

External links
 Sowerby, G. B., I. (1825). A catalogue of the shells contained in the collection of the late Earl of Tankerville : arranged according to the Lamarckian conchological system: together with an appendix, containing descriptions of many new species London, vii + 92 + xxxiv pp
 Lesson, R.P. (1842). Description d'une espèce nouvelle de Nériptère. Revue Zoologique, par la Société Cuvierienne. 5: 187–188.
  Christensen, C. C.; Hayes, K. A.; Yeung, N. W. (2021). Taxonomy, conservation, and the future of native aquatic snails in the Hawaiian Islands. Diversity. 13(5): 215: 1-12.

Neritidae
Molluscs of Hawaii
Endemic fauna of Hawaii
Gastropods described in 1825
Freshwater molluscs of Oceania